Noughaval is a civil parish which spans the counties of Longford and Westmeath in Ireland.

Description
Noughaval is one of 4 civil parishes in the barony of Kilkenny West and one of 8 civil parishes in the barony of Shrule, both in the Province of Leinster.

Noughaval civil parish comprises 41 townlands in County Westmeath and the village of Ballymahon and 10 townlands in County Longford.

County Westmeath: Aghafin, Aghanapisha, Ardnacrany North, Ardnacrany South, Ballynalone, Bawn, Brackagh, Cannorstown (Chapman), Cannorstown (Hogan), Carrick, Cartron, Cartroncroy, Cloghannagarragh, Clogher, Clonkeen, Coolaleena, Coolvin, Corbrack, Corlis, Creggan, Creggy, Doonamona, Doonis, Gortmore, Inchbofin, Inchturk, Kilcornan, Kippin, Lecade, Lisdossan, Lissaquill, Lissoy, Maghera, Muckanagh, Nicholastown, Noughaval, Rath Lower, Rath Upper, Ross, Streamstown and Tonlegee.

County Longford: Annagh, Carrickbeg, Cartron, Clooncullen, Creevagh Beg, Creevaghmore, Garrynagh, Keel, Keelbaun and Rathmore.

Note: The Longford townland of Annagh is in the barony of Rathcline.

The neighbouring civil parishes are: Forgney (County Longford) to the north, Ballymore to the east, Bunown, Drumraney and Kilkenny West to the south, and Shrule (Longford) to the west and north.

References

External links
Noughaval civil parish at the IreAtlas Townland Data Base
Noughaval civil parish, County Westmeath at townlands.ie
Noughaval civil parish, County Longford at townlands.ie
Noughaval civil parish, County Westmeath at The Placenames Database of Ireland
Noughaval civil parish, County Longford at The Placenames Database of Ireland

Civil parishes of County Westmeath
Civil parishes of County Longford